New Zealand sent a delegation to compete at the 2008 Summer Paralympics in Beijing. The country was represented by thirty athletes competing in 7 sports: athletics, boccia, cycling, power-lifting, shooting, swimming and wheelchair rugby.

Medalists

Sports

Athletics

Men's track

Men's field

Women's track

Women's field

Boccia

Cycling

Women's road

Women's track

Powerlifting

Shooting

Swimming

Men

Women

Wheelchair rugby

See also
2008 Summer Paralympics
New Zealand at the Paralympics
New Zealand at the 2008 Summer Olympics

References

External links
Beijing 2008 Paralympic Games Official Site
International Paralympic Committee
List of New Zealand's Paralympians in Beijing, New Zealand Herald

Nations at the 2008 Summer Paralympics
2008
Summer Paralympics